WKUB (105.1 FM) is a radio station broadcasting a country music format. Licensed to Blackshear, Georgia, United States, the station is currently owned by John Higgs' Broadcast South, through licensee Higgs Multimedia Group, LLC. It features programming from ABC Radio .

References

External links

KUB